The Jakarta Open was a men's tennis tournament played in Jakarta, Indonesia.  The event was held in 1973 and 1974 and from 1993 to 1996 and was played on outdoor hard courts. It was part of the World Series circuit of the Association of Tennis Professionals (ATP) Tour.

Finals

Singles

Doubles

See also
 Danamon Open – women's tournament

External links
 ATP results archive

 
Tennis tournaments in Indonesia
Hard court tennis tournaments
ATP Tour
Defunct tennis tournaments in Indonesia
Defunct sports competitions in Indonesia